Tian'anmendong is a station on Line 1 of the Beijing Subway. It provides the most direct access to many Beijing tourist sites, including Tiananmen Square, the Forbidden City, and the National Museum of China.

Location 
The station is located on the eastern side of Tian'anmen Square and next to the north entrance of the National Museum of China.

Station Layout 
The station has an underground island platform.

Exits 
There are four exits, lettered A, B, C, and D. Exit B is accessible.

References

External links

 

Railway stations in China opened in 1999
Beijing Subway stations in Dongcheng District